Wesley Taylor McAfee (October 20, 1919 – January 26, 1984) was an American football halfback. He played for the Philadelphia Eagles of the National Football League (NFL) in 1941. With the Eagles, he appeared in eight games, and carried nine times for six yards, caught three passes for 30 yards and a touchdown, completed a four-yard pass, kicked two extra points, punted once for 32 yards, returned three punts for 21 yards, and returned two kickoffs for 64 yards.

McAfee played college football for the Duke Blue Devils football team alongside his older brother, future Pro Football Hall of Fame halfback George McAfee. After college, Wes McAfee was drafted in the 16th round of the 1941 NFL Draft by the Pittsburgh Steelers.

References

1919 births
1984 deaths
American football halfbacks
Philadelphia Eagles players
Players of American football from Kentucky
Duke Blue Devils football players
People from Laurel County, Kentucky